Entre Ríos Municipality  is the sixth municipal section of the Carrasco Province in the Cochabamba Department in central Bolivia. Its seat Entre Ríos had 3,796 inhabitants at the time of census 2001.

Languages 
The languages spoken in the municipality are mainly Spanish and Quechua.

References 

Municipalities of the Cochabamba Department